Playlogic Entertainment NV was a company active in mobile gambling and console publishing, established in 2002.

Their gaming and gambling products are Fun Play and Real Play, handled by Microgaming Ltd. The company operates their Real Play components under a Maltese gambling license. Their other products include video game software for Sony, Microsoft, Nintendo and Apple.

History 

Formed in 2010, Playlogic Entertainment NV is a continuation of Playlogic International NV, which was established as a traditional console video game publisher.
After restructuring, the company continued with the same management team and employees.

The restructured company completed the acquisition of mobile gaming and gambling company WannaGaming International BV in 2011. WannaGaming was founded 4 years prior to the acquisition. WGM Ltd. in Malta, using the brand name WannaGaming, has a long-term partnership with market leader Microgaming Ltd. for all mobile gaming and gambling products, banking services and 24/7 international help desk services. The company operates under a Maltese gambling license. WGM Ltd. in Malta is a subsidiary of Playlogic Entertainment.

Restructuring 
Playlogic Entertainment, Inc. was listed on the 'OTCBB' in New York, (ticker symbol: PLGC) as of June 2005 and completed all SEC required filings until Q1 2010. The stock is currently pink sheet and Playlogic Entertainment Inc. has been renamed to Donar Ventures.

Playlogic International N.V. was a full subsidiary of Playlogic Entertainment, Inc. and was based in Amsterdam, the Netherlands. Playlogic published a variety of games developed internationally but also through their in-house production facility, Playlogic Game Factory BV.

Playlogic represented a work force who were responsible for Distributing, Selling, Licensing, PR & Marketing, publishing and Product Development.

In 2009, Fairytale Fights, which was developed in house by Playlogic Games Factory and published by Playlogic International NV, was released.

PlaylogicGame Factory: Based in Breda (the Netherlands) was a game development studio with a team of circa 80 people developing a number of titles on several platforms.

Bankruptcy and restart 
On July 27, 2010, rumours started to surface around Playlogic about a possible bankruptcy, after a few years of struggling with major losses and new games failing to bring in new cash. The rumours were confirmed the following day by a filing at the US Securities and Exchange Commission. This filing revealed that the company had voluntarily entered into 'surseance van betaling', the Dutch equivalent of Chapter 11.

On August 4, 2010, the court declared Playlogic as officially bankrupt. Later that year, Playlogic Entertainment NV relaunched with some of the original staff, taking a focus on publishing already made games on digital platforms and gambling related games. In December 2014, Playlogic went bankrupt again.

First-party development for Sony 
Playlogic Game Factory also worked as a First Party contractor for Sony Computer Entertainment Europe (SCEE). This relationship continued for 4 years, in which Playlogic Game Factory developed 5 products that were published by Sony Computer Entertainment Europe. These games were Eyepet, Eyepet Move Edition, Pom Pom Party, Aqua Vita and Mesmerize I&II. These titles used either the PlayStation 2 EyeToy camera or the PlayStation 3 Eye Camera.

The company's principal sources of revenue were derived from publishing operations. Playlogic owned most of the intellectual property they published.

References

External links 
Company and investor information at Yahoo Finance

Companies traded over-the-counter in the United States
Video game development companies
Video game publishers
Video game companies established in 2002
Video game companies disestablished in 2010
Defunct video game companies of the Netherlands
Companies based in Amsterdam
Playlogic Entertainment games